Surekha Sikri (19 April 1945  16 July 2021) was an Indian theatre, film and television actress. Sikri received several awards, including three National Film Awards and a Filmfare Award. A veteran of Hindi theatre, she made her debut in the 1977 political drama film Kissa Kursi Ka and went on to play supporting roles in numerous Hindi and Malayalam films, as well as in Indian soap operas. 

Sikri won the National Film Award for Best Supporting Actress thrice, for her roles in Tamas (1988), Mammo (1995) and Badhaai Ho (2018). She was awarded the Indian Telly Award for Best Actress in a Negative Role in 2008 for her work in the primetime soap opera Balika Vadhu and won the Indian Telly Award for Best Actress in a Supporting Role for the same show in 2011. In addition, she won the Sangeet Natak Akademi Award in 1989 for her contributions towards Hindi theater. Her appearance in Badhaai Ho (2018) got her immense recognition and appreciation from viewers and critics. She won three awards: the National Film Award for Best Supporting Actress, Filmfare Award for Best Supporting Actress and the Screen Award for Best Supporting Actress for her performance in the film.

Early life and background
Sikri belonged to Uttar Pradesh and she spent her childhood in Almora and Nainital. At the beginning of her career, she attended Aligarh Muslim University, Aligarh. Later, she graduated from the National School of Drama (NSD) in 1971, and worked with the NSD Repertory Company for over a decade before shifting base to Mumbai. Surekha Sikri was the recipient of 1989 Sangeet Natak Akademi Award.

Personal life and death
Her father was in the Air Force and her mother was a teacher. She was married to Hemant Rege and she has a son, Rahul Sikri, who lives in Mumbai and works as an artist. Her husband, Hemant Rege, died due to heart failure on 20 October 2009.
Noted actor Naseeruddin Shah is her former brother-in-law, as his first marriage was with her step-sister Manara Sikri, also known as Parveen Murad. She is their daughter Heeba Shah's maternal aunt. Heeba acted as the younger version of her aunt's character, Dadisa in the television serial Balika Vadhu.

Sikri died on 16 July 2021 at the age of 76 of a cardiac arrest in Mumbai. She had been suffering from the complications of two previous brain strokes.

Filmography

Films

 Kissa Kursi Ka (1977) - Meera
 Anaadi Anant (1986)
 Tamas (1988) - Rajo
 Salim Langde Pe Mat Ro (1989) - Ameena
 Parinati (1989) - Ganesh's wife
 Nazar (1990) - Bua
 Karamati Coat (1993) - Old Woman
 Little Buddha (1993) - Sonali
 Mammo (1994) - Fayyazi
 Naseem (1995)
 Sardari Begum (1996) - Idbal Bai
 Janmadinam (1998, Malayalam film) - Amma (Sarasu's mother)
 Sarfarosh (1999) - Sultan's Mother (special appearance)
 Dillagi (1999) - Kiran
 Cotton Mary (1999) - Gwen
 Hari-Bhari (2000) - Hasina
 Zubeidaa (2001) - Fayyazi
 Deham (2001) - Om's mother
 Kali Salwar (2002) - Anwari
 Mr. and Mrs. Iyer (2003) - Najma Khan
 Raghu Romeo (2003) - Mother
 Raincoat (2004) - Manoj's mom
 Tumsa Nahin Dekha (2004) - Daksh's grandma
 Jo Bole So Nihaal (2005) - Mrs. Balwant Singh (Nihaal's mom)
 Humko Deewana Kar Gaye (2006)
 Sniff (2017) - Bebe
 Badhaai Ho (2018) - Durga Devi Kaushik
 Sheer Qorma (2020)
  Ghost Stories (2020 film)
 Kya Meri Sonam Gupta Bewafa Hai? (2021) (Posthumous release, final role)

Television

Ek Tha Raja Ek Thi Rani as Ranaji's grandmother ("Badi Rani Ma") (2015–2017)
Pardes Mein Hai Mera Dil as Indumati Lala Mehra (Dadi) (2016–2017)
Balika Vadhu as Kalyani Devi Dharamveer Singh/Dadisa (2008-2016)
Maa Exchange
Maha Kumbh: Ek Rahasaya, Ek Kahani as Rudra's grandmother (2014–2015)
Saat Phere - Saloni Ka Safar as Bhabo (2006–2009)
Banegi Apni Baat
Kesar as Saroj
Kkehna Hai Kuch Mujhko
Saher
Godan
C.I.D. as Maithali (1 Episode, 2007)
Samay
Aahat
Mano Ya Na Mano
Just Mohabbat as Mrs. Pandit (1996–2000)
Kabhie Kabhie as Lakshmi Pathak
Sanjha Chula (1990)

Awards and nominations

Sikri has won the National Film Award for Best Supporting Actress three times, more than any other actress. Her other accolades include a Filmfare award, a Screen award and six Indian Television Academy awards.

References

External links
 
 
 Surekha Sikri at New York Times
 Surekha Sikri at Allmovie

1945 births
2021 deaths
Actresses from New Delhi
20th-century Indian actresses
21st-century Indian actresses
Indian film actresses
Indian stage actresses
Indian television actresses
Indian soap opera actresses
Actresses in Hindi cinema
Actresses in Malayalam cinema
Actresses in Hindi television
National School of Drama alumni
Recipients of the Sangeet Natak Akademi Award
Best Supporting Actress National Film Award winners
Hindi theatre
Filmfare Awards winners
Screen Awards winners
Actors from Mumbai